Wallie Coetsee (born 11 July 1972) is a South African professional golfer.

Wallie was encouraged to take up the game of golf by his father, Ockert, a tomato farmer in Tzaneen. He played very little competitive golf as an amateur and won only a few small tournaments. Upon turning professional in 1992, he struggled to make an impression on the Tour. He convinced his father to allow him three more years on the Tour, and promised that if he didn't make it he would join him working on the family farm. He improved slightly and again begged his father for another year. The result was his maiden professional victory in the 1997 FNB Namibia Open - a win which sparked off one of his most successful years on the Tour. Finishing 11th in the SA Open in 1999.  In June 2012, Wallie and his family decided to relocate to Jeffreys Bay in the Eastern Cape where he would focus more seriously on his golf and it would also give him quality time with his family. Coetsee turned professional in 1992 and plays on the Sunshine Tour. He has two tour victories the 1997 FNB Namibia Open and the 2014 Mopani Copper Mines Zambia Open.

Professional wins (2)

Sunshine Tour wins (2)

References

External links

South African male golfers
Sunshine Tour golfers
Golfers from Johannesburg
People from Kouga Local Municipality
1972 births
Living people